Rennicks is a surname. Notable people with the surname include:

 Justin Rennicks (born 1999), American soccer player
 Ken Rennicks (born 1950), Irish Gaelic football player and coach
 Stephen Rennicks, Irish musician

See also
 Rennick, surname